Sander Lloyd Nelson (December 1, 1938 – February 14, 2022) was an American drummer. Nelson, one of the best-known rock and modern jazz drummers of the late 1950s and early 1960s, had several solo instrumental Top 40 hits and released over 30 albums.  He was a session drummer on many other well-known hits.  He lived in Boulder City, Nevada, where he continued to experiment with music on keyboards and piano.

Life and career
Sander Lloyd Nelson was born in Santa Monica, California to Lloyd and Lydia Nelson on December 1, 1938. Nelson attended high school with Jan Berry and Dean Torrence, who later became recording stars as Jan and Dean, and Kim Fowley. In 1959, Fowley produced Nelson's first recording, "Geronimo" by the Renegades (a band made up of Nelson, Richard Podolor, Bruce Johnston, and songwriter Nick Venet). Although the single flopped on the national charts, it charted in some of the Mid West markets. The song featured in the 1959 film Ghost of Dragstrip Hollow released by American International Pictures.

After gaining respect as a session drummer, Nelson played on several hit singles including the Teddy Bears' "To Know Him Is To Love Him" (1958), The Hollywood Argyles' "Alley Oop" (1960) and Kathy Young and the Innocents' "A Thousand Stars" (1960).

His instrumental recording "Teen Beat", on Original Sound Records, rose to number 4 on the Billboard Hot 100 in 1959. It sold over one million copies and was awarded a gold disc. Subsequently he signed with the Imperial label and pounded out two more Top 40 hits, "Let There Be Drums", which went to number 7 on the Hot 100, and "Drums Are My Beat".  In December 1961 the British music magazine, NME, reported that "Let There Be Drums" had gone Top 10 in both the United Kingdom and United States. All three were instrumentals (a feat rarely repeated). Guitar on these hits was played by co-writer Richard Podolor, later a songwriter and record producer.

Near the end of 1963, Nelson was in a motorcycle accident. The injuries necessitated amputation of his right foot and part of that leg. Nonetheless, Nelson continued to record into the early 1970s, releasing two or three albums a year, consisting of cover versions of popular hits plus a few original compositions.

In September 2008, Nelson and a few friends, recording as Sandy Nelson and the Sin City Termites, released a new record of original compositions, Nelsonized, on the independent Spinout label. Other band members included Eddie Angel (guitarist for Los Straitjackets), Remi Gits, and Billy Favata of Torturing Elvis.

Nelson died in Las Vegas on February 14, 2022, at the age of 83 from complications of a stroke he suffered in 2017.

Discography

(with Billboard (BB) and Cashbox (CB) peak positions)

Singles
"Teen Beat" (BB #4, CB #4) / Big Jump—Original Sound 5  (1959)
"Drum Party" / "Big Noise From Winnetka" — Imperial 5630 (1960)
"Party Time" / "The Wiggle" — Imperial 5648 (1960)
"Bouncy" / "Lost Dreams" — Imperial 5672 (1961)
"Cool Operator" / "Jive Talk" — Imperial 5708 (1961)
"Big Noise From The Jungle" / "Get With It" — Imperial 5745 (1961)
"Let There Be Drums" (BB #7, CB #9) / "Quite A Beat" — Imperial 5775 (1961)
"Drums Are My Beat" (BB #29, CB #57) / "The Birth Of The Beat" (BB #75) - Imperial 5809 (1962)
"Drummin' Up A Storm" (BB #67) / "Drum Stomp" (BB #86, CB #100) - Imperial 5829 (1962)
"All Night Long" (BB #75) / "Rompin' & Stompin'" - Imperial 5860 (1962)
"...And Then There Were Drums" (BB #65, CB #95) / "Live It Up" (BB #101) - Imperial 5870 (1962)
"Teenage House Party" / "Day Train" — Imperial 5884 (1962)
"Let The Four Winds Blow" (BB #107) / "Be Bop Baby" — Imperial 5904 (1962)
"Ooh Poo Pah Doo" / "Feel So Good" — Imperial 5932 (1963)
"You Name It" / "Alexes" — Imperial 5940 (1963)
"Here We Go Again" / "Just Bull" — Imperial 5965 (1963)
"Caravan" / "Sandy" — Imperial 5988 (1964)
"Drum Shack" / "Kitty's Theme" — Imperial 66019 (1964)
"Castle Rock" / "You Don't Say" — Imperial 66034 (1964)
"Teen Beat" '65 (BB #44, CB #37) / "Kitty's Theme" — Imperial 66060 (1964)
"Reach For A Star" (BB #133) / "Chop Chop" — Imperial 66093 (1965)
"Let There Be Drums '66" (BB #120) / "Land Of 1000 Dances" — Imperial 66107 (1965)
"Drums A Go Go" (BB #124) / "Casbah" — Imperial 66127 (1965)
"A Lover's Concerto" / "Treat Her Right" — Imperial 66146 (1965)
"Sock It To 'Em, J.B." / "The Charge" — Imperial 66193 (1966)
"Pipeline" / "Let's Go Trippin'" - Imperial 66209 (1966)
"The Drums Go On" / "Lawdy Miss Clawdy" — Imperial 66246 (1966)
"Peter Gunn" / "You Got The Hummin'" - Imperial 66253 (1966)
"Rebirth Of The Beat" / "The Lion In Winter" — Imperial 66350 (1969)
"Manhattan Spiritual" (BB #119) / "The Stripper" — Imperial 66375 (1969)
"Let There Be Drums And Brass" / "Leap Frog" — Imperial 66402 (1969)
"Sapporo '72" / (B-side unknown) - United Artists 50830 (1972, unreleased)
"Dance With The Devil" / "Sunshine Of My Life" — United Artists 383 (1974)
"Drum Tunnel" / "Boogie #5" — Veebletronics 1 (1984)
"Hunk Of Drums" / "Witch Hunt" — Veebletronics 2 (1984)
"A Drum Is A Woman" / "Boogie #5" — Veebletronics 3 (1984)

Albums
NOTE: There were separate Cashbox charts for stereo and mono albums until 1965
Sandy Nelson Plays Teen Beat - Imperial 9105 (Mono)/12044 (Stereo) (1960)
Originally issued with white cover, later issued with red cover.  Features re-recorded version of "Teen Beat"
He's a Drummer Boy (Later retitled Happy Drums) - Imperial 9136/12089 (1961)
Let There Be Drums (BB #6) - Imperial 9159 (CB #7)/12080 (CB #17) (1962)
Drums Are My Beat (BB #29) - Imperial 9168 (CB #24)/12083 (CB #31) (1962)
Drummin' Up a Storm (BB #55) - Imperial 9187 (CB #82)/12189 (1962)
Golden Hits (BB #106) - Imperial 9202/12202 (1962)
Country Style- Imperial 9203/12203 (1962)
Reissued in 1966 as On The Wild Side
Compelling Percussion - Imperial 9204/12204 (1962)
Reissued in 1966 as ...And Then There Were Drums
Teenage House Party - Imperial 9215/12215 (1963)
Reissued in 1966 with different cover
The Best of the Beats - Imperial 9224/12224 (1963)
Reissued in 1966 with different cover
Beat That Drum - Imperial 9237/12237 (1963)
Sandy Nelson Plays - Imperial 9249/12249 (1963)
Be True to Your School - Imperial 9258/12258 (1964)
Live! In Las Vegas (BB #122) - Imperial 9272 (CB #58)/12272 (1964)
Despite the title, all tracks are studio recordings with live audience dubbed in
Teen Beat '65 (BB #135) - Imperial 9278/12278 (1965)
Drum Discothèque (BB #120) - Imperial 9283/12283 (1965)
Drums a Go-Go (BB #118, CB #82) - Imperial 9287/12287 (1965)
Boss Beat (BB #126) - Imperial 9298/12298 (1966)
"In" Beat (BB #148) - Imperial 9305/12305 (1966)
Super Drums - Imperial 9314/12314 (1966)
Beat That #!!@* Drum (CB #94) - Imperial 9329/12329 (1966)
Cheetah Beat - Imperial 9340/12340 (1967)
The Beat Goes On - Imperial 9345/12345 (1967)
Soul Drums - Imperial 9362/12362 (1967)
Boogaloo Beat - Imperial 9367/12367 (1968)
Rock and Roll Revival - Imperial 12400 (1968)
Rebirth of the Beat - Imperial 12424 (1969)
Manhattan Spiritual - Imperial 12439 (1969)
Groovy - Imperial 12451 (1970)
Disco Dynamite - United Artists L35491 (1975)

Budget compilations
Walkin' Beat! - Sunset SUM-1114 (Mono)/SUS-5114 (Stereo) (1966)
Teen Drums - Sunset SUM-1166/SUS-5166 (1967)
And There Were Drums (Drums And More Drums) - Sunset SUS-5224 (1968)
Heavy Drums - Sunset SUS-5261 (1969)
Sandy Nelson Plays Fats Domino Hits - Sunset SUS-5291 (1970)
Drums, Drums, Drums - Sunset SLS 50060 (Stereo) (1972)

References

Bibliography
Joel Whitburn, Top 40 Hits 
Marc Ribowsky, He's A Rebel, 1989, Penguin Books,

External links
Sandy Nelson & The Sin City Termites on MySpace
Sandy Nelson page
Sandy Nelson page on Drummerworld.com
Sandy Nelson on Spaceage Pop web-site
Discography at Instromania (in French)
[ Sandy Nelson biography] at Allmusic website
 
 
Sandy Nelson -- Boulder City's cave man - Las Vegas Sun Newspaper
Sandy Nelson NAMM Oral History Interview (2012)

1938 births
2022 deaths
American amputees
Imperial Records artists
Musicians from Santa Monica, California
20th-century American drummers
American male drummers
20th-century American male musicians
American songwriters
The Teddy Bears members